A signal square is an aerodrome equipment internationally defined at the annex 14 of the Convention on International Civil Aviation by the International Civil Aviation Organization.
It contains ground symbols to indicate visually the conditions on the aerodrome to over-flying aircraft. There are four basic signals.

References

Air traffic control